John Shields may refer to:

 John Shields (chef), American chef, food writer, and host of the PBS television show Coastal Cooking with John Shields
 John Shields (cricketer) (1882–1960), English cricketer 
 John Shields (explorer) (1769–1809), member of the Lewis and Clark Expedition
 John C. Shields (1848–1892), American jurist from Arizona Territory
 John G. Shields (1811–1856), American politician from Iowa
 John K. Shields (1858–1934), U.S. Senator from Tennessee
 John V. Shields (1932–2014), American businessman
 Jack Shields (1929–2004), Canadian politician